Alberto Rosario (born January 10, 1987) is a Dominican former professional baseball catcher. He has played in Major League Baseball (MLB) for the St. Louis Cardinals.

Career

St. Louis Cardinals
Rosario began his professional career with the Los Angeles Angels of Anaheim organization in 2005. The St. Louis Cardinals promoted Rosario to the major leagues on July 6, 2016.  He played 11 seasons in Minor League Baseball before making his major league debut July 9, 2016, against the Milwaukee Brewers.  He singled and batted in a run in his first MLB at-bat in an 8−1 win. He elected free agency on November 6, 2017.

Arizona Diamondbacks
On January 5, 2018, Rosario signed a minor league contract with the Arizona Diamondbacks that includes a non-roster invitation to spring training. He elected free agency on November 3, 2018. On January 9, 2019, he re-signed with the Diamondbacks to a minor league deal. He was assigned to AAA Reno Aces to start the 2019 season. He elected free agency on November 7, 2019. On January 10, 2020, Rosario again re-signed with the Diamondbacks to a minor league deal for the 2020 season. On May 22, 2020, Rosario was released by the Diamondbacks organization. On July 27, 2020, Rosario re-signed with the Diamondbacks on a minor league contract. He became a free agent on November 2, 2020.

See also
 List of Major League Baseball players from the Dominican Republic

References

External links

1987 births
Living people
Arizona League Angels players
Arkansas Travelers players
Azucareros del Este players
Cedar Rapids Kernels players
Chattanooga Lookouts players
Dominican Republic expatriate baseball players in the United States
Dominican Summer League Angels players
Estrellas Orientales players

Jackson Generals (Southern League) players
Major League Baseball catchers
Major League Baseball players from the Dominican Republic
Memphis Redbirds players
Orem Owlz players
Pawtucket Red Sox players
People from Bonao
Portland Sea Dogs players
Rancho Cucamonga Quakes players
Reno Aces players
Salt Lake Bees players
Springfield Cardinals players
St. Louis Cardinals players
Toros del Este players
World Baseball Classic players of the Dominican Republic
2017 World Baseball Classic players